Sheikh Mohammed Ridha Al-Shabibi (1889 – 1965) was an Iraqi national figure, statesman, poet and educator. A member of the prominent Al-Shabibi family of Najaf he studied religion and literature, and as a young man published poetry in major publications of the Arab World (Syria, Lebanon, and Egypt).

He lived from 1889 until 1965, and played a major role for Iraq to achieve independence after World War I. He was the emissary of petitions, letters and messages from Iraqi political and religious figures to Sharif Hussein bin Ali and Faisal I to explain the desire and importance of Iraqis to achieve freedom and independence in 1919.

This was a major step as he publicized formally outside Iraq the desire of Iraq's self-determination and its opposition to British rule after World War I. This was the start of a process that actually led to Iraq's independence on 3 October 1932.

Mohammed Ridha Al-Shabibi also served in Chamber of Deputies of Iraq from the 1920s through the 1940s and as minister of education in several cabinets (1924–1925, 1935, 1937–1938, 1941, 1948). He was the president of the Chamber of Deputies from December 1943 to December 1944. He was elected president of the Iraqi Academy in 1928–1929 and in the 1930s became a member of the Arabic Language Academy in Cairo. He authored a number of books on Iraqi history, the Iraqi dialect, and education.

Family and personal life
Mohammed Ridha Al-Shabibi married Shamsa Rahmatalla in 1926. They had 4 sons (As'ad, Akram, Amjad, and Sinan Al-Shabibi) and 6 daughters (Wajiha, Hadiya, Aida, Arwa, Asmaa, and Dunia Al-Shabibi). As'ad Al-Shabibi his elder son was abducted by the Iraqi Baathist regime for his political views on the morning of 26 November 1980. His youngest son, Sinan Al Shabibi became the governor of the Central Bank of Iraq in 2003 immediately after the fall of the regime.

References

External links
Related topics -  أصداء ثقافية | تقرير خاص حول الذكرى الخمسون لرحيل الشاعر الشيخ محمد رضا الشبيبي 
Related topics -  فلم (شيخ الوطنية) محمد رضا الشبيبي 
Related topics -  في بغداد والنجف استذكار المفكر والسياسي الكبير محمد رضا الشبيبي بذكرى رحيله الخمسين 
Related topics - محمد رضا الشبيبي: المعرفة الموسوعية
Related topics - الشيخ محمد رضا الشبيبي...المعارض الدائم
Related topics - محمد رضا الشبيبي والشيخ محمد باقر الشبيبي
Related topics - محمد رضا الشبيبي
Related topics - تاريخ محمد رضا الشبيبي
Related topics - History of Iraq

1889 births
1965 deaths
Presidents of the Chamber of Deputies of Iraq
Government ministers of Iraq
20th-century Iraqi poets
20th-century poets
Iraqi Arab nationalists
Pupils of Muhammad Kadhim Khorasani
Members of Academy of the Arabic Language in Cairo